Send Me to the Clouds is a 2019 Chinese drama film directed and written by Teng Congcong, and starring Yao Chen, Justin Yuan and Li Jiuxiao. It was screened at the 22nd Shanghai International Film Festival. The film had four nominations and won Best Supporting Actress award for Wu Yufang at the 32nd Golden Rooster Awards.

Plot
Sheng Nan (Yao Chen), an over-30 single woman, learns that she has ovarian cancer and decides to find a new job to raise money for surgery, and to explore sexual experiences before the illness makes such encounters impossible. She finds work ghostwriting the biography of an elderly and flirtatious millionaire, while trying to start a relationship with a single man closer to her own age. In the words of Variety, the film addresses the unique perspectives of unmarried women that have been categorized as "leftover women" in Chinese society, and "The film’s most powerful message... is that women should be able to seek sex without shame."

Cast
 Yao Chen as Sheng Nan
 Justin Yuan as Liu Guangming
 Li Jiuxiao as Mao Cui
 Liang Guanhua as Li Ping
 Yang Xinming as Li Ping's father - Lao Li
 Wu Yufang as Liang Meizhi
 Shi Qiang as Sheng Nan's father

References

External links
 

2019 films
2019 drama films
Chinese drama films
Chinese-language films